The  ('Enmann's History of the Emperors') is a modern term for a hypothesized Latin historical work, written in the 4th century but now lost.

The German scholar Alexander Enmann made in 1884 a comparison of several late Roman historical works and found many similarities, which could not be explained by a direct literary relationship between the extant works (Eine verlorene Geschichte der roemischen Kaiser und das Buch De viris illustribus urbis Romae). Enmann postulated a theory of a lost historical work, which was the common source for authors including Aurelius Victor, Eutropius, and the author of the Historia Augusta. The work is not mentioned by any late Roman historian, but Enmann's analysis is today largely accepted and modified. There are some scholars, especially , who question its existence, but the majority accept it.

The Kaisergeschichte was a brief historical work. It had covered the time from emperor Augustus to 337 or 357. Besides the three historians mentioned above, it was used by Festus, Jerome, and the anonymous Epitome de Caesaribus.

See also
Thirty Tyrants (Roman)
Augustan History

References 
 Alexander Enmann, Eine verlorene geschichte der römischen Kaiser und das buch de viris illustribus urbis romae. Philologus, no. Supplement-Band 4, Heft 3. (1884). p. 337-501.
 Willem den Boer, Some Minor Roman Historians. Leiden, 1972.
 Timothy David Barnes, The Sources of the Historia Augusta. Collection Latomus v. 155. Bruxelles: Latomus, 1978.
  (with bibliography).

Notes 

4th-century documents
4th-century history books
Hypothetical documents
Roman Empire in late antiquity